Barsul is a village in Burdwan II CD block in Bardhaman Sadar North subdivision of Purba Bardhaman district in the state of West Bengal, India.

Geography

CD block HQ
The headquarters of Burdwan II CD block are located at Barshul.

Urbanisation
73.58% of the population of Bardhaman Sadar North subdivision lives in the rural areas. Only 26.42% of the population lives in the urban areas, and that is the highest proportion of urban population amongst the four subdivisions in Purba Bardhaman district. The map alongside presents some of the notable locations in the subdivision. All places marked in the map are linked in the larger full screen map.

Demographics
As per the 2011 Census of India Barshul had a total population of 5,483, of which 2,796 (51%) were males and 2,687 (49%) were females. Population below 6 years was 489. The total number of literates in Barshul was 4,141 (77.26% of the population over 6 years).

Famous
The village was developed by the government of West Bengal as  the dream project by  Bidhan Chandra Roy in 1956 . DVC irrigation lockgate was established in the year of 1956. Barsul is an ancient village on the north bank of Damodar River. It is enriched with cultured and educated society.

Barsul is famous for Durga puja - more than 10 barowari pujas and the De Zamindar family's puja. Centuries old De Zamindar family's mansion is a heritage of this village with a private museum (Suvendra Mohan De Aitihasik Sangrahalaya).

Rajshekhar Basu an author, lexicographer, chemist and visioner is the gem of this block. He was born at Bamunpara near Amrah around 6 km west to Barshul .
Narayan Sanyal an eminent modern Bengali writer and a Civil engineer of Bengal Engineering College lived in the village during the foundation of New Barshul as a personnel of Public Works Department and National Building Organisation , Ministry of Works and Housing, Eastern Region, Govt of India.
Syed Mustafa Siraj an eminent writer and Sahitya Akademi Award winner lived in the village for training at Barshul Centre For Co-Operative Management, Barshul during seventies.

Culture
Gajan is celebrated at Barshul Dharamshila (Dharmathakur) temple for four days in the Bengali month of Joishtho.

David J. McCutchion mentions the charchala dolmancha of Krishna-Balarama at Barshul as having rich terracotta decoration.

Healthcare
Barshul block primary health centre at Barshul (with 10 beds) is the main medical facility in Burdwan II CD block. There are primary health centres at Bamchandipur, PO Jateram (with 2 beds) and Kashiara, PO Hatgobindapur (with 4 beds). In 2012, the average monthly patients attending Barshul BPHC were 7,975 and average monthly admissions were 37. It handled 297 annual emergency admissions.

See also - Healthcare in West Bengal
A few private clinics with eminent doctors are also at service. Most of the doctors are from the village. Some 9 medical stores are in service.

References

Villages in Purba Bardhaman district